Elizabeth Kite  is an activist and youth leader from Tonga, who founded Take The Lead, an organisation that empowers the voices of young people in Tonga. In 2017 she was presented with a Queens Young Leader Award.

Biography 
Kite was born in New Zealand, but grew up in Tonga, where she attended primary school, and in Australia, where she attended secondary school. In 2013 she moved to Tonga to work for non-governmental organisation there.

In 2017 Kite founded of Take The Lead (TTL), formerly known as Tonga Youth Leaders, an organisation that enables young Tongan's voices to be amplified through training and grant provision. In 2018 Kite spoke out about the issues surrounding drug use for young people in Tonga. In September 2020 TTL ran an educational programme encouraging more Tongan youth to vote. Kite runs She Leads Fale Alea ‘O Tonga, which is leadership programme for young women, based on a mock parliament. Its mission is to address the low representation of women in Tongan politics.

In 2017 Kite was awarded a Queens Young Leader Award, in recognition of her work on community empowerment. Her award was presented by Queen Elizabeth II. Kite wore a traditional tapa which her mother had worn when the Queen first visited Tonga in 1953.

Kite is the Pacific Regional Representative for the Commonwealth Youth Council.

References 

Year of birth missing (living people)
Living people
Tongan activists
Youth activists
Tongan women's rights activists
Tongan women in politics

External links 

 'Ofa Ki Tonga Talanoa with Elizabeth Kite
 Interview with Elizabeth Kite